Anna Marie Filbey (born 11 October 1999) is a footballer who plays as a midfielder for Crystal Palace in the FA Women's Championship and the Wales national team. She is described by Tottenham as a "brave and technically-gifted defensive midfielder".

Club career
On 11 February 2018, Filbey made her debut for Arsenal, coming on in the 80th minute, replacing Emma Mitchell in a 4–0 Arsenal win over Yeovil Town in the 2017–18 season. That proved to be her only league appearance with the club as she joined Tottenham Hotspur on 1 August. In February 2021 she joined Scottish Women's Premier League club Celtic on loan until the end of the 2020–21 season.

International career

Filbey has represented England at the youth level for the U17 and the U19 team. On 20 September 2018, Filbey received a call up for the Welsh national team, but was later forced to pull out due to injury.

She made her senior international debut for Wales on 8 October 2019, starting a 1–0 UEFA Women's Euro 2021 qualifying away win over Belarus.

References

External links

1999 births
Living people
English women's footballers
Welsh women's footballers
Wales women's international footballers
Women's Super League players
Arsenal W.F.C. players
Women's association football midfielders
Tottenham Hotspur F.C. Women players
Celtic F.C. Women players
Charlton Athletic W.F.C. players
Women's Championship (England) players
Scottish Women's Premier League players